DUP or Dup may refer to:

Politics
 Democratic Unionist Party, a conservative and unionist party in Northern Ireland
 Democratic Unionist Party (disambiguation)
 Democratic Union Party (disambiguation)
 Democratic United Party (South Korea), a former name of the Democratic Party of Korea

Computing
 dup (system call)
 DUP programming language

Other uses
 Dup (drum), a Caribbean membranophone
 Dup (cuneiform), a sign in cuneiform writing
 Dances of Universal Peace, a spiritual practice
 Daughters of Utah Pioneers, a women's organization
 Duano' language (ISO-639: dup)

See also
 Dupe (disambiguation)
 Duplication (disambiguation)
 Di Gi Charat